The 1970 Chicago White Sox season was the team's 70th season in the American League, and its 71st overall. They finished with a 56–106 record, their third-worst in 114 seasons of Major League Baseball, and finished in last position in the American League West, 42 wins behind the first-place Minnesota Twins.

This was their last season of 100 losses or more until 2018, when they reached the century mark on the final day of the season.

Offseason 
 October 15, 1969: Woodie Held was released by the White Sox.
 December 18, 1969: Pete Ward was traded by the White Sox to the New York Yankees for Mickey Scott and cash.
 January 17, 1970: John Tamargo was drafted by the White Sox in the 4th round of the 1970 Major League Baseball draft (Secondary Phase), but did not sign.

Regular season

Season standings

Record vs. opponents

Opening Day lineup 
 Walt Williams, RF
 Luis Aparicio, SS
 Carlos May, LF
 Bill Melton, 3B
 John Matias, 1B
 Buddy Bradford, CF
 Syd O'Brien, 2B
 Duane Josephson, C
 Tommy John, P

Notable transactions 
 June 4, 1970: 1970 Major League Baseball draft
 Lee Richard was drafted by the White Sox in the 1st round (6th pick).
 Goose Gossage was drafted by the White Sox in the 9th round.
 September 11, 1970: Lee Maye was selected off waivers by the White Sox from the Washington Senators.

Roster

Player stats

Batting 
Note: G = Games played; AB = At bats; R = Runs scored; H = Hits; 2B = Doubles; 3B = Triples; HR = Home runs; RBI = Runs batted in; BB = Base on balls; SO = Strikeouts; AVG = Batting average; SB = Stolen bases

Pitching 
Note: W = Wins; L = Losses; ERA = Earned run average; G = Games pitched; GS = Games started; SV = Saves; IP = Innings pitched; H = Hits allowed; R = Runs allowed; ER = Earned runs allowed; HR = Home runs allowed; BB = Walks allowed; K = Strikeouts

Farm system 

LEAGUE CHAMPIONS: Duluth-Superior, GCL White Sox

Notes 
The White Sox' only worse records have been 49 wins against 102 losses in 1932, and 51 wins against 101 losses in 1948.

References 

 1970 Chicago White Sox at Baseball Reference

Chicago White Sox seasons
Chicago White Sox season
Chicago